Carrickmore railway station served Carrickmore in County Tyrone, Northern Ireland. The Portadown, Dungannon and Omagh Junction Railway opened the station on 2 September 1861. In 1876 it was taken over by the Great Northern Railway. It closed on 15 February 1965.

Routes

References

Disused railway stations in County Tyrone
Railway stations opened in 1861
Railway stations closed in 1965
1861 establishments in Ireland
Railway stations in Northern Ireland opened in the 19th century